Kanoko (written: 鹿子, 鹿乃子, かの子 or かのこ in hiragana) is a feminine Japanese given name. Notable people with the name include:

, Japanese cross-country skier
, Japanese writer, poet and Buddhist scholar
, Japanese manga artist
, Japanese diver

Fictional characters
, a character in the anime series Sweet Valerian
, a character in the manga series Velvet Kiss
, protagonist of the manga series The Secret Notes of Lady Kanoko
, a character in the anime series Maho Girls PreCure!

See also
Kanoko Dam, a dam in Hokkaidō, Japan

Japanese feminine given names